Zoran Pešić may refer to:

Zoran Pešić (rugby league) (born 1983) Serbian rugby league footballer
Zoran Pešić (footballer born 1983) Serbian football player
Zoran Pešić (footballer born 1951) Serbian football player and manager